Anne Boleyn (15011536) was the second wife of Henry VIII of England.

Anne Boleyn, Ann Boleyn, Anna Boleyn or Ann Bollin may also refer to:

People
Anne Shelton (courtier) (1483–1556), née Anne Boleyn, aunt of Queen Anne Boleyn
Ann Bolling Randolph Fitzhugh (1747–1805), American colonial era woman
Ann Boleyn (singer) (born 1960), American musician
Ann Bollin (born 1960), American politician

Entertainment
Anna Boleyn, 1920 film by Ernst Lubitsch
Anne Boleyn (play), 2010 play by Howard Brenton
 Anne Boleyn (The Tudors), character in The Tudors
Anne Boleyn (TV series), 2021 series

See also
Anne Boleyn in popular culture

Boleyn, Anne